Mhasla is a census town in Raigad district in the Indian state of Maharashtra.

Geography
It has an average elevation of 93 metres (305 feet).

Demographics
 India census, Mhasla had a population of 59,914. It is one hour away from the Mumbai-Goa Highway and 3 hours (190 km) from Mumbai.

References

Cities and towns in Raigad district
Talukas in Maharashtra